Tomoko Moriguchi-Matsuno (née Moriguchi; born August 25, 1945), also known as Tomoko Matsuno, is an American businesswoman who served as CEO of Uwajimaya from 2007 to 2017.

Biography 
Moriguchi-Matsuno was born at Tule Lake War Relocation Center, the youngest child of Fujimatsu Moriguchi and Sadako Tsutakawa. She is the niece of George Tsutakawa. Her family was interned at Tule Lake during World War II; Tomoko was the last of 1,490 children born there. After the war, the family moved to Seattle's Japantown, where Moriguchi-Matsuno's father re-established Uwajimaya on South Main Street in 1946.

Moriguchi-Matsuno succeeded to the position as CEO of Uwajimaya on September 24, 2007 after her older brother Tomio stepped down from the position. Prior to her appointment, she also served as executive vice president of the organization. Besides her position as CEO, she also served as president of Uwajimaya. During Moriguchi-Matsuno's tenure as CEO, Uwajimaya opened its store in Renton, Washington. It also moved one of its stores from Overlake to a new, larger location in Bellevue.

Along with serving in Uwajimaya, Moriguchi-Matsuno also presided over One Reel's board of directors.

Moriguchi-Matsuno stepped down from her position as CEO of Uwajimaya on February 24, 2017. Her family received the 2017 Tomodachi Award for their contributions to the relations between Japan and Seattle.

References 

1945 births
Living people
20th-century American businesspeople
21st-century American businesspeople
American people of Japanese descent
Businesspeople from Seattle
Japanese-American internees